The Arc Mountain wood mouse (Hylomyscus arcimontensis) is a species of murid rodent in the genus Hylomyscus. It is native to central Tanzania and northern Malawi.

References

Hylomyscus
Mammals described in 2005